Ardhaveedu is a village in Prakasam district of the Indian state of Andhra Pradesh. It is the mandal headquarters of Ardhaveedu mandal in Markapur revenue division.

Geography 

References 

Villages in Prakasam district
Mandal headquarters in Prakasam district